Platyptilia hokowhitalis is a species of moth in the family Pterophoridae. This species is endemic to New Zealand. This species has been classified as Data Deficient by the Department of Conservation.

Taxonomy 
This species was originally described and illustrated by George Hudson in 1939. He used a specimen collected on 10 November 1889 in Hokowhitu Bush in Palmerston North. Hudson had previously discussed the species in 1928 mistakenly under the name Platyptilia celidota. The holotype specimen is held at the Museum of New Zealand, Te Papa Tongarewa.

Description 
Hudson described the species as follows:

Distribution 
This species is endemic to New Zealand. The range of this species includes the Wellington, Whanganui and Taranaki areas. It has been found at Meremere Bush.

Habitat
The holotype of this species was captured in forest habitat. This type locality is now a suburb of Palmerston North.

Host species 
Larvae of this species have been reared from a shrubby Euphrasia.

Conservation status 
This species has been classified as having the "Data Deficient" conservation status under the New Zealand Threat Classification System.

References

External links

Image of holotype specimen

Moths described in 1939
hokowhitalis
Endemic fauna of New Zealand
Moths of New Zealand
Taxa named by George Hudson
Endemic moths of New Zealand